The 1980 European Curling Championships were held from 30 November to 6 December at the Hvidovre Ice Rink arena in Copenhagen, Denmark.

The Scottish men's team skipped by Barton Henderson won their second European title, and the Swedish women's team skipped by Elisabeth Högström won their fourth European title.

For the first time, the men's team of Luxembourg and women's teams of Netherlands and Whales took part in the European Championship.

Men's

Teams

Round robin

  Team to playoffs (final)
  Team to playoffs (semifinal)
  Teams to tiebreaker

Tiebreaker

Playoffs

Final standings

Women's

Teams

Round robin

  Teams to playoffs

Playoffs

Final standings

References

European Curling Championships, 1980
European Curling Championships, 1980
European Curling Championships
Curling competitions in Denmark
International sports competitions hosted by Denmark
European Curling Championships
European Curling Championships
European Curling Championships
20th century in Copenhagen